Mohammed Saleh Barghash Jaralla Al-Menhali (born 27 October 1990) is an Emirati association football player who plays for Al-Wahda.

References

External links

 

Emirati footballers
1990 births
Living people
Al Jazira Club players
Al Wahda FC players
Baniyas Club players
Association football fullbacks
UAE Pro League players